Heiko Habermann (born 2 November 1962 in Berlin) is a German rower.

References 
 
 

1962 births
Living people
People from East Berlin
Rowers from Berlin
East German male rowers
Olympic rowers of East Germany
Rowers at the 1988 Summer Olympics
Olympic bronze medalists for East Germany
Olympic medalists in rowing
Medalists at the 1988 Summer Olympics
Recipients of the Patriotic Order of Merit in bronze